The Journal of Developmental and Behavioral Pediatrics is a peer-reviewed medical journal covering developmental behavioral pediatrics. The journal was established in 1980 and is published by Lippincott Williams & Wilkins. The editor-in-chief is Lee Pachter (Nemours Alfred I. duPont Hospital for Children). It is the official journal of the Society for Developmental and Behavioral Pediatrics.

Abstracting and indexing 
The journal is abstracted and indexed in:

According to the Journal Citation Reports, the journal has a 2016 impact factor of 2.393.

References

External links 
 
 Society for Developmental and Behavioral Pediatrics

Publications established in 1980
Lippincott Williams & Wilkins academic journals
Pediatrics journals
English-language journals
Developmental psychology journals
9 times per year journals